This is a list of people awarded the title Hero of the Soviet Union who were of Georgian (Kartvelian) ethnicity. It does not include non-Kartvelian residents of the Georgian SSR who were awarded the title.

 Lavrenty Avaliani 
 Noe Adamia
 Galaktion Alpaidze
 Suren Aslamazashvili ru
David Bakradze ru
 Razhden Bartsits ru
 Grigoru Bakhtadze ru
 Chichiko Bendeliani
 Goergy Berdashvili ru
 Nikolai Beriya ru
 Vladimir Beroshvili ru
 Aleksandr Bibilashvili ru
 Georgy Bilanishvili ru
 Grigory Buachidze ru
 Akaky Bukiya ru
 Grigory Gabriadze ru
 Sokrat Galustashvili ru
 Shota Gamtsemlidze ru
 Akhmetger Gardapkhadze ru
 Vladimir Gvantseladze ru
 Ivan Gventsadze ru
 Arkady Gegeshidze ru
 Nikolai Gogichaishvili ru
 Georgy Gotsiridze ru
 Vladimir Gubeladze ru
 Aleksandr Gurgenidze ru
 Amiran Daneliya ru
 Ivan Demetrashvili ru
 David Dzhabidze ru
 Vladimir Dzhandzhgava
 Tengiz Dzhaparidze ru
 Israfil Dzhincharadze ru
 Mikhail Diasamidze ru
 Vladimir Yesebua ru
 Boris Zumbulidze ru
 Goergy Inasaridze ru
 Aleksey Inauri ru
 Aleksandr Kananadze ru
 Vladimir Kankava ru
 Melton Kantariya
 Vasily Kvachantiradze
 Sergey Ketiladze ru
 German Kilasoniya ru
 Shalva Kiriya ru
 Yermolai Koberidze ru
Vakhtang Lezhava ru
 Georgy Leladze ru
 Viktor Leselidze
 Konstantin Leselidze
 Vladimir Lursmanashvili ru
Georgy Maisuradze ru
 Karl Mebagishvili ru
 Garri Merkviladze ru
 David Merkviladze ru
 Fore Mosulishvili ru
 Vladimir Naneishvili ru
 Vladimir Papidze ru
 Georgy Papuashvili ru
 Aleksey Pirmisashvili ru
 Galaktion Razmadze ru
 Shota Rostiashvili ru
 Grigoru Samkharadze ru
 Bondzi Sordiya ru
 Aleksandr Sulaberdze ru
 Grigory Suramelashvili ru
 Grigory Skhulukhiya ru
 David Tavadze ru
 Georgy Tvauri ru
 Akaky Tereladze ru
 Shota Tibua ru
 Konstantin Tkabladze ru
 Yelisey Tugushi ru
 Vladislav Turkuli ru
 Kirill Ukleba ru
 Noi Urushadze ru
 Zakar Kitalishvili ru
 Ilya Khmaladze ru
 Platon Tsikoidze ru
 Boris Tsulukidze ru
 Aleksandr Tsurtsumiya ru
 Konstantin Tsutskirdze ru
 Porfiry Chanchibadze
 Otari Chechelashvili ru
 Sergo Chigladze ru
 Vakhtang Chikovani ru
 Shalva Chilachava ru
 Levan Chubinidze ru
 Vladimir Chkhaidze ru
 Sergery Chkhaidze ru
 Georgy Shengeliya ru
 Abibo Shishinashvili ru
 Shota Shurgaya ru

References 

 
 Russian Ministry of Defence Database «Подвиг Народа в Великой Отечественной войне 1941—1945 гг.» [Feat of the People in the Great Patriotic War 1941-1945] (in Russian).

Heroes of the Soviet Union lists